Alonzo Earl Short Jr. (born January 27, 1939) is a retired United States Army lieutenant general who served as Director of the Defense Information Systems Agency.

Born in North Carolina, Short grew up in Portsmouth, Virginia and attended I. C. Norcom High School. He graduated from Virginia State College with a B.S. degree in education in 1962. Short later earned a master's degree in business management from the New York Institute of Technology.

Short was commissioned through the Army ROTC program. After several Army Signal Corps assignments, he served as executive officer of a signal battalion in Europe. Short was then sent to South Vietnam in 1967 and again in 1972.

As a brigadier general, Short served as commander of U.S. Army Information Systems Management Activity (ISMA) at Fort Monmouth, New Jersey. In July 1986, he became deputy commander of the U.S. Army Information Systems Engineering Command (ISEC) and then assumed command in September 1987. Promoted to major general in September 1988, Short was made deputy commander of the U.S. Army Information Systems Command.

Promoted to lieutenant general in June 1990, Short became the commanding officer of the Information Systems Command. After that, he served as director of the Defense Information Systems Agency from August 1991 to July 1994.

Short has been conferred honorary doctorates by Charles H. Mason University in San Diego and by his alma mater Virginia State University.

References

1939 births
Living people
People from Greenville, North Carolina
People from Portsmouth, Virginia
Virginia State University alumni
African-American United States Army personnel
United States Army personnel of the Vietnam War
New York Institute of Technology alumni
Recipients of the Meritorious Service Medal (United States)
Recipients of the Legion of Merit
United States Army generals
Recipients of the Distinguished Service Medal (US Army)
Recipients of the Defense Distinguished Service Medal
21st-century African-American people
African Americans in the Vietnam War
20th-century African-American people